There are 2 districts in Japan with the same name.
 Hidaka District, Wakayama
 Hidaka District, Hokkaido